Tomislav Barbarić (born 29 March 1989) is a Croatian retired footballer who played as a defender.

Club career
Barbarić came through the youth ranks of Dinamo Zagreb, before joining the senior squad during the Prva HNL winter break in 2008. He made 5 appearances, of which on three occasions he started in the first-eleven.

During the summer transfer window, he agreed to join Dinamo's affiliate Lokomotiva on a six–months loan. He featured in 13 out of 15 league matches and scored 1 goal before he returned to Dinamo in January 2009. By the end of the season he appeared 6 times in the league and 2 times in Croatian Cup. Barbarić established himself as a first–team regular at the start of the 2009–10 season, as the centre–back Robert Kovač missed all of the early season matches due to an injury.

On June 27, 2015, Barbarić signed a two-year contract with FK Sarajevo. In May 2016, he left Sarajevo.

After Sarajevo, he played for K.V. Kortrijk, NK Rudeš and FC Atyrau.

In February 2019, he came back to Bosnia and signed for HŠK Zrinjski Mostar on a deal lasting until 2021. Barbarić left Zrinjski in January 2021. He finished his career at Austrian lower league side SVH Waldbach in October 2021.

International career
Barbarić was a part of the Croatia under–21 national team. His first cap at the under–21 level came on 1 October 2008 in a match against Slovenia.

He was also capped at under–17 and under–19 levels.

Career statistics

Honours
Dinamo Zagreb
1. HNL: 2007–08, 2008–09
Croatian Cup: 2007–08, 2008–09
Croatian Super Cup: 2010

References

External links

1989 births
Living people
Footballers from Zagreb
Association football central defenders
Croatian footballers
Croatia youth international footballers
Croatia under-21 international footballers
GNK Dinamo Zagreb players
NK Lokomotiva Zagreb players
NK Istra 1961 players
SK Sturm Graz players
RNK Split players
FK Sarajevo players
K.V. Kortrijk players
NK Rudeš players
FC Atyrau players
HŠK Zrinjski Mostar players
Croatian Football League players
Austrian Football Bundesliga players
Premier League of Bosnia and Herzegovina players
Belgian Pro League players
Kazakhstan Premier League players
Croatian expatriate footballers
Expatriate footballers in Austria
Croatian expatriate sportspeople in Austria
Expatriate footballers in Bosnia and Herzegovina
Croatian expatriate sportspeople in Bosnia and Herzegovina
Expatriate footballers in Belgium
Croatian expatriate sportspeople in Belgium
Expatriate footballers in Kazakhstan
Croatian expatriate sportspeople in Kazakhstan